Club de Fútbol Atlético de Monzón is a Spanish football team based in Monzón, in the autonomous community of Aragon. Founded in 1950 it plays in 3ª – Group 17, holding home games at Estadio Isidro Calderón, with a 5,000-seat capacity.

Season to season

51 seasons in Tercera División

Honours
Tercera División: 2008–09

References

External links
Official website 
Futbolme team profile 

 
Football clubs in Aragon
Association football clubs established in 1950
1950 establishments in Spain
Province of Huesca